A gosu (literally "drummer") is a drummer in performances of pansori, a form of traditional Korean narrative/theater that is usually performed by just two musicians: a solo singer and a drummer. The gosu supports the sorikkun, or singer, by providing rhythms with a soribuk (pansori drum), a shallow barrel drum with a pine body and two cowhide heads. Impromptu short verbal sounds made by the gosu, called chuimsae, also play an important role.

Famous people

Late Joseon Dynasty 

 Song Gwang-rok (宋光祿)
 Joo Duk-gi (朱德基)

Japanese Colonial Period 

 Han Sung-jun (韓成俊)

Recently 

 Kim Myung-hwan (金命煥)

See also
Korean music
Korean culture

References

Pansori